Willie Watson is a former Irish international lawn bowler.

He competed in the fours at the 1978 Commonwealth Games in Edmonton, Alberta and four years later won a bronze medal in the fours with Sammy Allen, Frank Campbell and John McCloughlin at the 1982 Commonwealth Games in Brisbane, Australia.

In 1986 he won another bronze medal in the fours at the 1986 Commonwealth Games in Edinburgh with Ernie Parkinson, Billie Montgomery and Roy McCune.

References

Living people
Male lawn bowls players from Northern Ireland
Bowls players at the 1978 Commonwealth Games
Bowls players at the 1982 Commonwealth Games
Bowls players at the 1986 Commonwealth Games
Commonwealth Games bronze medallists for Northern Ireland
Commonwealth Games medallists in lawn bowls
Year of birth missing (living people)
Medallists at the 1982 Commonwealth Games
Medallists at the 1986 Commonwealth Games